Michael Joseph Kilroy (November 4, 1869 – October 2, 1960) was a Major League Baseball pitcher. He was the brother of Matt Kilroy. He pitched four career games with an 0–3 record and an ERA of 9.00. His brother, Matt, also played in the majors.

External links
Baseball-Reference

1869 births
1960 deaths
Major League Baseball pitchers
Baltimore Orioles (AA) players
Philadelphia Phillies players
Baseball players from Philadelphia
19th-century baseball players
Chattanooga Lookouts players
Lancaster (minor league baseball) players
Sacramento Senators players
Stockton (minor league baseball) players
Syracuse Stars (minor league baseball) players
Albany Senators players
Providence Grays (minor league) players
Providence Clamdiggers (baseball) players
Binghamton Bingoes players
Allentown Buffaloes players
Allentown Kelly's Killers players
Easton (minor league baseball) players
Ashland (minor league baseball) players
Buffalo Bisons (minor league) players
Grand Rapids Gold Bugs players
Millville (minor league baseball) players
Pottsville (minor league baseball) players
Sunbury (minor league baseball) players
Youngstown Puddlers players